The mission of Arizona Native Plant Society (AZNPS) is to promote knowledge, appreciation, conservation and restoration of Arizona native plants and their habitats, as well as the use of native plants in urban landscapes and gardens. Among its initiatives are the Plant Atlas Project of Arizona (PAPAZ), which trains AZNPS volunteers in botanical fieldwork; publication of booklets and brochures promoting the use of native plants; compilation and web publication of plant lists for various natural areas of Arizona and northern Mexico; grants for publication assistance and research; and pioneering work in invasive species education and removal.

AZNPS currently has five chapters that hold monthly seasonal meetings, field trips, workshops and special presentations, staff tables at local events, and network with other nongovernmental organizations and government agencies in restoration and invasive species work. The organization has two publications: The Plant Press, published biannually in themed issues offering in-depth articles on a topic, and Happenings, a quarterly listing of local chapter and state news.

History
AZNPS began in 1977, when nursery owners, landscapers, and professionals created the non-profit society dedicated to educating Arizonans about the state's native plants, as well as other xeric landscape plants, including many new horticultural imports. Early on, AZNPS published a series of eight landscaping booklets designed to educate the public about the use of native and xeric plants in desert landscapes.

About the year 2000, AZNPS began to promote the total use of native plants in the landscape, as native plants are best adapted to local habitats and soils, use the least amount of water, and are easier to maintain and keep disease-free than are imported plants. They also provide an extension of native habitat into the urban area as a "corridor" for native pollinators and other wildlife.

Weedwacker volunteer groups
The Sonoran Desert Weedwackers is an organization of Tucson-area volunteers. Since 2000, it has removed invasive buffelgrass (Cenchrus ciliaris) from Tucson Mountain Park, and worked with other groups to remove fountain grass (Cenchrus setaceus), another fire-prone African import, from the Sonoran Desert.

Publications
 The Plant Press
 Arizona Rare Plant Committee (2001). Arizona rare plant field guide: a collaboration of agencies and organizations. Washington: U.S. Government Printing Office. (available online)

References

External links
 Arizona Native Plant Society website
 Southern Arizona Buffelgrass Coordination Center (SABCC)
 Sonoran Desert Weedwackers

Environmental organizations based in Arizona
Organizations established in 1977
Native plant societies based in the United States
Flora of Arizona